Sir John Henry Kennaway, 3rd Baronet,  (6 June 1837 – 6 September 1919) was an English Conservative Party politician.

Early life and education
Kennaway was born on 6 June 1837 in Park Crescent, London, England, to Sir John Kennaway, 2nd Baronet and Emily Frances Kennaway (née Kingscote). He was educated at Harrow School, an all-boys public school in London. He studied law and modern history at Balliol College, Oxford, graduating with a first class Bachelor of Arts (BA) degree.

Career

Political career
Kennaway was Member of Parliament (MP) for East Devon from 1870 to 1885, when the constituency was abolished by the Redistribution of Seats Act 1885.  He was then MP for the new Honiton constituency from 1885 until the January 1910 general election.

He was made a Privy Counsellor in 1897 and appointed CB in the 1902 Coronation Honours. From 1908 to 1910 he was Father of the House of Commons.

Other work
He was called to the bar at Inner Temple in 1864. He practiced as a barrister in the western circuit.

He was a governor at the Kings School Ottery St Mary. As homage to him the school has named one of its houses after him—Kennaway.

Kennaway served as an officer in the Rifle Volunteers for forty-two years. He was commanding officer of the 3rd Volunteer Battalion, Devonshire Regiment, from 1896 to 1902, when he was appointed its Honorary Colonel, a position he retained when it was merged into the 4th Battalion, Devonshire Regiment, in the Territorial Force in 1908.

Church of England
Kennaway was active in the Church of England. He was a low church, evangelical Anglican, who supported the temperance movement. He was a member of the Church Association which campaigned against Anglo-Catholicism, but he spoke against the Public Worship Regulation Act 1874 that would allow legal actions again ritualist priests. In 1904, he was appointed as a member of the Royal Commission on Ecclesiastical Discipline: it reported in 1906, recommending the repeal of the Public Worship Regulation Act 1874.

He served as president of the Church Missionary Society and of the London Society for Promoting Christianity Amongst the Jews.

References

External links 
 
Sir John Henry Kennaway in the National Archives

1837 births
1919 deaths
Conservative Party (UK) MPs for English constituencies
Deputy Lieutenants of Devon
Members of the Privy Council of the United Kingdom
Baronets in the Baronetage of Great Britain
Companions of the Order of the Bath
UK MPs 1868–1874
UK MPs 1874–1880
UK MPs 1880–1885
UK MPs 1885–1886
UK MPs 1886–1892
UK MPs 1892–1895
UK MPs 1895–1900
UK MPs 1900–1906
English Anglicans
People educated at Harrow School
Alumni of Balliol College, Oxford
Devonshire Regiment officers
English evangelicals
Members of the Parliament of the United Kingdom for Honiton
Members of the Parliament of the United Kingdom for East Devon